Spesbona angusta, Spesbona (Ceres stream-damsel or Ceres streamjack) is a species of damselfly in the family Platycnemididae. 
This species was moved from the genus Metacnemis in 2013.

Identification

Distribution and habitat
It is endemic to the south western part of the Western Cape Province, South Africa. Its natural habitat is river pools with the aquatic plant Aponogeton. It is threatened by habitat loss.

References

Odonata of Africa
Insects of South Africa
Platycnemididae
Insects described in 1863